Various theistic positions can involve belief in a God or "gods". They include:

 Henotheism, belief in the supremacy of one god without denying the existence of others.
 Monotheism, the doctrine or belief that there is only one deity.
 Panentheism, the belief that a deity is a part of the universe as well as transcending it.
 Pantheism,  a doctrine identifying the deity with the universe and its phenomena.
 Polytheism, the worship of or belief in more than one god.
 idolism, the belief in or worship of idols.
These positions are all contrasted by atheism, the non-belief in god.

See also
Deity
Existence of God

Religious belief and doctrine